The Billboard Latin Pop Songs is a chart that ranks the best-performing Spanish-language Pop music singles of the United States. Published by Billboard magazine, the data are compiled by Nielsen SoundScan based collectively on each single's weekly airplay.

Chart history

See also
List of number-one Billboard Hot Latin Songs of 2006

References

United States Latin Pop Airplay
2006
2006 in Latin music